John Collins is an American professional sports executive, who currently serves as chief executive officer of On Location Experiences, an experiential hospitality business and the official hospitality partner of the National Football League. Collins previously served as chief operating officer of the National Hockey League, which was named "Sports League of the Year" by the SportsBusiness Journal and SportsBusiness Daily in 2014 and 2011. Before joining the NHL, he was a senior executive with the National Football League and the president and chief executive officer of the Cleveland Browns.

Career

On Location Experiences 
Collins joined On Location Experiences (OLE) in December 2015. According to a recent press release, “On Location is a partner to over 150 rights holders including the NFL, NCAA, the PGA of America and the United States Tennis Association.” Through its music divisions, CID Entertainment and Future Beat, On Location “also partners with numerous artists and music festivals, including Imagine Dragons, Metallica, Luke Bryan’s Crash My Playa and Electric Daisy Carnival.”

Since 2015, Collins has overseen the company’s expansion from a $35M, four-person, single event entity (formerly NFL On Location) to one now with over $600M in annual revenues across 150 right holder partnerships and 500 employees across 8 offices. Collins has led OLE’s rapid growth through acquisitions and deep strategic partnership ventures that have positioned On Location Experiences as a leading experiential hospitality business serving fans in sports, music and entertainment.

As part of the company's growth strategy and to differentiate OLE in the marketplace, Collins led the acquisitions of Anthony Travel, Kreate Inc., a leading full-service live creative concept, production and entertainment firm. OLE also entered into a joint venture with Ricky Kirshner of Kirshner Events, one of the entertainment industry's preeminent event producers. Most notably, on December 2017 On Location acquired PrimeSport, its strongest competitor and a leader in providing direct access to some of the biggest events in sports and entertainment. This deal created significant scale for On Location Experiences by expanding its platform of services and creating a combined company with rights to 150 teams, leagues and events. Through the deal with PrimeSport, On Location also acquired CID Entertainment, a hospitality leader in the live music and festival industry. In October 2018, On Location expanded its offerings in the music industry through the acquisition of Future Beat, a leading provider of VUIP concert experiences for the live music industry.

In 2019, Collins led the launch of On Location’s first-ever Bud Light Super Bowl Music Fest, a three-night concert series featuring some of the biggest names in music including Bruno Mars, Cardi B, Post Malone, Aerosmith, Migos and more and brought in over 41,000 guests to State Farm Arena in Atlanta, Georgia over the three nights.

The first major event under Collins’ leadership at OLE was Super Bowl LI, held in Houston on Feb. 5, 2017.  The wide array of hospitality events — which included concerts, pregame and postgame parties, and other high-end opportunities for fans to experience the NFL's biggest event of the year — was positively received by critics.

National Hockey League

As the NHL's chief operating officer beginning in August 2008, Collins was the architect of a brand and business strategy that helped transform the NHL and drove unprecedented levels of popularity and financial growth over the past decade. His strategic vision for the NHL brand focused on three pillars: build national scale for a sport, business and fan base that has been historically more tribal than other leagues; foster innovation and deploy the latest technology to create the best content for fans across new and multiple platforms; and expand the League's reach in North America and new international markets through innovative and strategic partnerships.

Collins was responsible for strategic leadership for all of the League's global business, media, marketing, sales, broadcast and digital media operations while working closely with the 30 clubs to support their ticketing, media and business operations. Joining the NHL in 2006, Collins became Senior Executive Vice President, Business and Media in May 2007. During Collins' tenure, the League grew from a $2B to a $4B industry, with national businesses averaging 18% annual revenue growth and 28% annual operating profit growth.

At the forefront of the League's growth, Collins' accomplishments include the negotiation of a $2.2B media rights deal in 2011 with NBC, a $5.2B landmark rights agreement in 2013 with Rogers - the largest media deal in League and Canadian history - and a groundbreaking $1B digital media rights partnership in 2015 with Major League Baseball Advanced Media.

Chicago Blackhawks owner and chairman Rocky Wirtz said, "We’re going to add another billion dollars in gross revenue in the very near future. The CBA is long-term [10 years, with opt-outs for the league and players after eight], and now the focus is on growth. I’m extremely happy about the future of the NHL."

During his tenure, Collins has led many new programming and technology initiatives, including the Winter Classic and Stadium Series outdoor games, which have played to sold-out football and baseball stadiums across the country, popular collaborations with HBO around all-access "24/7" series, the launch of the popular GameCenter LIVE streaming game subscription product and the introduction and launch of the NHL Network to 50 million U.S. homes. In conjunction with the NHL Players Association, Collins led the development of and negotiations for the "World Cup of Hockey" to be played in Toronto in September 2016 with participation from 15 international federations.  In September 2015, the NHL and Adidas, Fanatics and Outer Stuff announced a new $1B consumer products model designed to better and more directly serve NHL fans.

Prior to joining the NHL, Collins spent 15 years with the National Football League. As Senior Vice President of Marketing and Sales for the NFL, Collins led all marketing, programming, sponsorship, and advertising sales functions and was a key member of the team that launched the NFL Network. He negotiated billions of dollars of marketing and advertising deals, including a landmark, 10-year, $1.2 billion league-wide deal with PepsiCo.

Early career
Collins was president and chief executive officer of the Cleveland Browns from 2004 to 2006. Starting in 2002 with the inauguration of the "NFL Kickoff"  celebration at Times Square, he steered the NFL's focus toward big events, ultimately increasing NFL sponsorships by $1.9 billion, and doubled annual corporate sponsorship revenues to more than $200 million in 14 months. He also presided over the Super Bowl XXXVI halftime show featuring U2. These successes led to Advertising Age naming him one of America's top 50 marketers in 2003.

Collins began his career in professional sports with NFL Films, where he helped introduce programming such as HBO's Hard Knocks and Inside the NFL. Collins later teamed up with HBO Sports and its 24/7 reality franchise to develop "24/7 Penguins/Capitals:  Road to the NHL Winter Classic," which won a Sports Emmy Award for "Outstanding Edited Sports Special" in May 2011. The program is now repeated annually for every Winter Classic.

Notable deals

Coors
In February 2011, Collins negotiated a sponsorship deal for Coors to become the official beer of the NHL -- MillerCoors in the United States and MolsonCoors in Canada. Worth $375 million over seven years, The New York Times called it the biggest corporate sponsorship in N.H.L. history, noting, "For the N.H.L., the new beer sponsorship demonstrates its progress in recent years, especially in reaching young, affluent, technologically savvy fans who love their ice-cold suds."

Canadian media rights
In November 2013, Collins led the NHL negotiations to partner with Rogers Communications for exclusive rights to broadcast all national hockey telecasts in Canada. Estimated to more than double its Canadian television revenue, the 12-year deal is worth $5.2 billion.

The largest media rights arrangement in NHL history – and the largest ever sports-media deal ever in Canada – it kicked off in the 2014-15 season and run through the 2025-26 season.

NHL Winter Classic 
In 2007, Collins spearheaded the development of the NHL Winter Classic, played outdoors on New Year's Day, with NBC Sports executive Jon Miller, who told The Boston Globe that the key to making the game successful was "Collins’s vision, energy, and passion." The Classic's success earned Collins Marketer of the Year by Advertising Age Magazine. Sports Illustrated columnist Dan Shaughnessy said of the new Winter Classic, "now hockey owns New Year's Day the way baseball owns the Fourth of July and football owns Thanksgiving." Sports Business Journal named the NHL Winter Classic the 2008 "Event of the Year."  Revenues for the 2010 Classic, played between the Boston Bruins and the Philadelphia Flyers, were expected to generate $8 million in ticket sales at Fenway Park and $3 million in ad sales for NBC.

References

1961 births
Living people
Cleveland Browns executives
National Football League team presidents
National Hockey League executives
LIU Post alumni
American chief operating officers